Dusi is a village and panchayat in Amadalavalasa mandal in Srikakulam district in the Indian state of Andhra Pradesh.

Geography
Dusipeta is a village located on the banks of River Nagavali (Languliya). This is close to Mandal headquarters Amadalavalasa and District Headquarters Srikakulam in Andhra Pradesh.

This village was once upon a time very famous for drama artists and singers. The people are hardworking with more enthusiasm towards higher education and sports. Most of the employees work in state government jobs such as teachers, police, forest, and doctors. The youth well participate in volley ball tournaments mostly held on the banks of the river Nagavali when the river dries for few months before the monsoon begins.

The land is a very fertile land with three crops a year and once upon a time famous for mango and coconut trees. With development and industrialisation the greenery is vanishing and the air is getting polluted.

There are two political parties strong in village politics, YSR Congress Party and Telugu Desam Party while this village falls under the Amadalavalasa Constituency of the Andhra Pradesh Legislative Assembly. The funds for the village Panchayat will be allocated from the state government along with central assistance. Most of the roads are well laid with cement concrete as part of the government initiative and the opportunity to develop the roads was done better between 2013 - 2018.

The village has good connectivity to reach Amadalavalasa and Srikakulam in less than 15 minutes by road with good connectivity towards Palakonda, Visakhapatnam. The train station is DUSI, which was once visited by the Mahatma Gandhi but was neglected by the subsequent Governments in the Railways due to Operational reasons. The station is being developed with the platform upgrades. Majority of the Passenger trains stop while the Mail and Express trains will only stop in Amadalavalasa, which can be reached by road in 15 minutes.

The local body elections are due for the last one year and the people are intelligent to cast their votes. The Telugu Desam Party was ruling the Panchayat, but due to large scale corruption practises and conspiracies by the local leaders, the Telugu Desam Party has lost its glory. The last tenure 2013-2018 was held by the YSR Congress Party supporter and decent development has happened during that tenure.

Demographics
The people are very friendly and welcome any newcomers with a clean heart and they are very sensitive.

As of 2001 it had a population of 2,718 in 670 households.[1]

Dusi Peta, Nellimetta and Dusi come under the Village Panchayat, and the village progressed well during the tenure of Gram Sarpanch, Smt. Chigurupalli Kalyani from 2013 to 2018. More than 95% of the panchayat has the CC roads laid and water connection for majority of the households for drinking water.

Many development activities were done by the then Sarpanch, Smt. Chigurupalli Kalyani(2013-2018), irrespective of the support of the government.

The villagers celebrate Sankranti with their near and dear along with the local festivals- "Asirithalli" festival of the village goddesses in grand manner. The village is also home for rear temple like , "Trimurthulu- Brahma, Vishnu, Maheshwara" which was renovated three years ago, while the other famous temples are Shiva and Srinivasa.

Economy
There is a large scale steel plant located at Dusi owned by Concast Ferro Inc. However due to the chaos created by the then Telugu Desam Party Employee Union Leaders, the factory was shut down for the last two years.

The majority of the people work in State Government jobs or Central Government jobs like Indian Railways. The women very well utilise the self-help groups financed by the State Government. The village also has a few labourers who work on daily wages. The elderly receive the pension from the State Government. The youth are energetic and hard working and they can give their best provided an opportunity.

The direct income for the Village Panchayat in the form of taxes is from the Concat Ferro which is very minimal. Sand was once upon a income for the local panchayat based on the government policies change from time to time. There are large scale allegations on the Sand mafia especially supported by the Telugu Desam Party local leaders with the support from the MLA during 2013-2018 when the Telugu Desam Party was in ruling.
Best time to visit is during the monsoon and winter. The summers are very hot hear with temperatures soaring to around 45 degrees.

Transportation
The village has good connectivity to reach Amadalavalasa and Srikakulam in less than 15 minutes by road with good connectivity towards Palakonda, Visakhapatnam. Dusi railway station is situated on Khurda Road–Visakhapatnam section, part of the Howrah-Chennai main line under Waltair railway division of East Coast Railway zone.

References

Villages in Srikakulam district